The 1966 Gael Linn Cup is a representative competition for elite level participants in the women's team field sport of camogie, was won by Munster, who defeated Leinster in the final, played at Ballinlough.

Arrangements
Leinster defeated Connacht by 3–6 to 1–0 at Naas. Munster defeated Ulster 7–3 to 1–4 at Carrickmacross. All the Dublin players, except Kay Ryder, made themselves unavailable for the Gael-Linn final at Ballinlough and two goals from Bernie Maloney helped Munster win by 4–2 to 1–3.
 Agnes Hourigan wrote in the Irish Press: There was little doubt of Munster's supremacy against Leinster, who lacked the experience to match their opponents.

Final stages

|}

References

External links
 Camogie Association

1966 in camogie
1966